The Iași Metropolitan Area is a metropolitan association in Iași County, Romania, that includes the municipality of Iași and 19 nearby communes.

It has a total surface of 1,159 km² (21.2%) of the 5,476 km² that the county has, and a population of 403,572 inhabitants (52.2%) out of the 772,348 in the county (as per 2011 census). 

As defined by Eurostat, with 500,668 residents, the Iași functional urban area is the second most populous in Romania (after Bucharest).

History
Iași metropolitan area was constituted on 8 April 2004, to create a better business environment, to attract more consistent investments and to better coordinate environmental and infrastructure projects.

Communities

Cities
Iași

Communes

Transportation

Major airport

Major roads
 National roads DN24 and DN28 (both part of European routes E58 and E583)

References

External links 
 Official site
 Population of the Iași metropolitan area: volume, structures and demographic processes

Geography of Iași County
Metropolitan areas of Romania